IRS Airlines Limited was an airline based in Abuja, Nigeria. It operated scheduled domestic passenger services. Its main base was Nnamdi Azikiwe International Airport. The airline was established in 2002 and started operations in March 2002. It ceased operations in 2013.  The company slogan was Now you can go places.

Destinations 
IRS operated services to the following domestic scheduled destinations as of February 2013:

Abuja – Nnamdi Azikiwe International Airport Hub
Kaduna – Kaduna Airport
Kano – Mallam Aminu Kano International Airport
Lagos – Murtala Muhammed International Airport Hub
Maiduguri – Maiduguri International Airport
Yola – Yola Airport

Fleet 

The IRS Airlines fleet included the following aircraft (as of August 2016):

Accidents and Incidents 
 On 11 May 2014, an IRS Airlines Fokker 100, registered 5N-SIK, was returning from a post maintenance check-up when it crashed near the township of Ganla, Niger. The two pilots survived with undisclosed injuries.

References

External links 

Official website (archived)

Defunct airlines of Nigeria
Airlines established in 2002
Economy of Abuja
Nigerian companies established in 2002